Dream stick may refer to:
Vintage slang for opium pipe.
A variety of ice cream bar manufactured by Cadbury Schweppes